Blair Athol is a suburb of Sydney, in the state of New South Wales, Australia. Blair Athol is located 57 kilometres south-west of the Sydney central business district, in the local government area of the City of Campbelltown and is part of the Macarthur region.

History
British settlers began moving into the area in the early 19th century, establishing farms and orchards in the fertile soil. John Kidd, a Scotsman, built the original Blair Athol homestead in 1879. He named it after the village of Blair Atholl in Scotland. The following year he became the area's member of parliament, a position he held until 1904. In 1945, the land was sold to an engineering company who planned to build a factory in the area. Campbelltown Council rezoned the entire area as industrial in the hope that other industries would also move into the area but for the most part the land remained vacant. In 1992, the Council rezoned the land back to residential and the current suburb was born.

Demographics
According to the 2011 census of Population, there were 2,711 residents in Blair Athol. In Blair Athol, 51.0% of people were born in Australia. The most common countries of birth were Philippines 10.2%, India 4.3%, Fiji 4.1%, Laos 3.2% and New Zealand 2.2%. 53.0% of residents only spoke English at home. Other languages spoken at home included Hindi 6.6%, Tagalog 6.6%, Lao 3.8%, Filipino 2.7% and Spanish 2.4%. The most common responses for religion in Blair Athol were Catholic 35.3%, Anglican 11.3%, No Religion 8.0%, Buddhism 7.9% and Islam 7.3%.

References

Suburbs of Sydney
Towns in the Macarthur (New South Wales)
City of Campbelltown (New South Wales)